Jasper is a city in and the county seat of Jasper County, Texas, United States. Its population was 6,884 at the 2020 U.S. Census, down from 7,590 at the 2010 U.S. Census. Jasper (the "Butterfly Capital of Texas") holds an annual Butterfly Festival the first Saturday in October to celebrate the migration of the monarch butterflies.

History

19th century

The area, which was then part of Mexican Texas, was settled around 1824 by John Bevil. Thirty families occupied the settlement as early as 1830, when it was known as "Snow River", after John R. Bevil, a hero of the American Revolution.

In 1835, the town was renamed after William Jasper, a soldier from the American Revolution, who was killed attempting to plant the American flag at the storming of Savannah in 1779. Jasper was one of the 23 original counties when the Republic of Texas was created in 1836. Jasper became the county seat in 1844 and became part of the United States with the annexation of Texas in 1845.

During the Civil War, the town housed a Confederate quartermaster depot and served as a major center for Confederate communication, transportation, and supply. Jasper was a Confederate Army headquarters for a nine-county area. Following the war, Union troops led by General George Custer occupied Jasper, camping in the town square.

Educational institutions included the Jasper Male and Female High School, which operated until 1878, when it became the Southeast Texas Male and Female College, and Jasper Collegiate Institute, which operated from 1851 until 1874. The population declined to 360 in 1870, reflecting the hardships of the Civil War, but by 1885 had risen to 1,000.

In 1896, Jasper had a population of 1,200. With the arrival of the Gulf, Colorado and Santa Fe Railway early in the 20th century, Jasper grew into a center for the manufacture of timber products. Lumber from two sawmills, with a daily capacity of 125,000 board feet (295 m³), goods from basket and stave factories, logs, ties, poles, and pulpwood were shipped in 200 cars per month.

20th century

In 1901, the town of Jasper was robbed. The post office safe and the county treasurer's safe were blown open and robbed. The thieves set a fire, and as the town had no fire department, the entire town was completely destroyed. Damages were estimated at $100,000. What was stolen from the safes was unknown. The thieves escaped.

Jasper served as headquarters for the Lower Neches Valley Authority's construction program, including Dam "B" at Town Bluff and engineering and surveying for a dam at Magee Bend on the Angelina River. Local farmers raised broiler chickens and beef, and in the 1950s turned to dairying. Jasper also became the headquarters of the Morgan and Lindsey chain of variety stores (otherwise known as dime-stores), which at one time operated 85 outlets in Texas, Arkansas, Louisiana, Mississippi, and Alabama.

In June 1998, the murder of James Byrd Jr. catapulted Jasper into national news and led to the creation of the Matthew Shepard and James Byrd Jr. Hate Crimes Prevention Act. Three men—John William King, Lawrence Russell Brewer, and Shawn Berry—were tried and convicted of capital murder. King and Brewer received the death penalty, while Berry, who was the only suspect who cooperated during the investigation and implicated King and Brewer, was sentenced to life in prison. Brewer was executed on September 21, 2011. King was executed on April 24, 2019.

21st century
In 2000, Jasper had 8,247 residents and around 250 businesses. Jasper was one of the primary locations for the recovery of the Space Shuttle Columbia wreckage in February 2003.

Jasper was greatly affected by Hurricane Rita on September 25, 2005, as it moved inland. The city suffered considerable damage and was left without power or potable water for about three and a half weeks.

The Jasper Arboretum Project began in 2000, and the Outdoor Learning Center was added in 2012 to create  of public gardens, walking trails, a master gardener greenhouse, and a nature classroom.

In 2012, Jasper returned to national attention during a bitterly fought political feud over the hiring and firing of Jasper's first black police chief, Rodney Pearson. To fire Pearson, two black city council members were recalled in the narrowly divided city. Free of Voting Rights Act preclearance requirements, Jasper is moving to annex largely white suburbs. The feud highlighted Jasper's persistent struggle with racism throughout its history.

Geography
The city of Jasper is in northern Jasper County, with U.S. Routes 190 and 96 crossing south of the city center. US 190 leads southeast  to Newton and southwest  to Woodville, while US 96 leads north  to San Augustine and south  to Beaumont. Texas State Highway 63 passes through Jasper with US 190, but leads northeast  to Burkeville and northwest  to Zavalla.

Sandy Creek runs passes just south of the city center, flowing west to the Neches River in B. A. Steinhagen Lake.

Climate

Demographics

As of the 2020 United States census, there were 6,884 people, 2,809 households, and 1,997 families residing in the city.

At the census of 2010, 7,590 people (compared with 8,247 people in the 2000 census), 2,890 households, and 1,892 families resided in the city. The population density was 733.9 people per square mile (283.4/km2). The 3,445 housing units averaged 333.1 per square mile (128.7/km2). The major racial and ethnic groups in the city, as a percentage of the total city population, were: 64.2% non-Hispanic African American; 41.9% non-Hispanic White; 10.8% Hispanic or Latino of any race; and 1.5% Asian, with the remaining 1.6% mainly consisting of non-Hispanics of two or more races. The Hispanic or Latino population was subdivided (as a percentage of total city population) into 5.9% other races, 3.9% White, 78% African American, and 1.1% in other categories, mainly two or more races.

Of the 2,888 households, 34.4% had children under the age of 18 living with them, 44.7% were married couples living together, 20.3% had a female householder with no husband present, and 31.0% were not families. About 27.6% of all households were made up of individuals, and 12.6% had someone living alone who was 65 years of age or older. The average household size was 2.54 and the average family size was 3.20.

In the city, the population was distributed as 29.4% under the age of 18, 8.3% from 18 to 24, 22.8% from 25 to 44, 24.3% from 45 to 64, and 15.2% who were 65 years of age or older. The median age was 35 years. For every 100 females, there were 82.3 males. For every 100 females age 18 and over, there were 77.1 males.

Economy
The median income for a household in the city was $24,671, and for a family was $32,242. Males had a median income of $28,432 versus $17,266 for females. The per capita income for the city was $12,997. About 23.3% of families and 28.4% of the population were below the poverty line, including 34.3% of those under age 18 and 23.3% of those age 65 or over.

Government
Jasper is administered by a city council of six members. The council is composed of five council members and an elected mayor, accompanied by a hired city manager under the manager-council system of municipal governance.

The council is elected under four single-member districts (numbered 1 through 4), and one at-large district (numbered 5 ); the mayor is elected at-large.

Parks and recreation

Education
The city is served by the Jasper Independent School District and Vista Academy of Jasper.

The school district partners with Lamar Institute of Technology and Stephen F. Austin State University.

The Texas Legislature designated Jasper ISD as being in the boundary of Angelina College's district.

The city operates the Jasper Public Library.

Media

A weekly newspaper, the Jasper Newsboy, has been published continuously since 1865. It is considered the oldest continuously published weekly newspaper in Texas.

The area is served by:
 KJAS radio 107.3 FM
 KTXJ radio 102.7 FM
 KCOX radio 1350 AM
 KVHP-LD television 34

Notable people
Don Adams, Texas legislator and lobbyist
 Max Alvis, former Major League Baseball (MLB) third baseman, who played with the Cleveland Indians and the Milwaukee Brewers, born in Jasper
 Derick Armstrong, Canadian football wide receiver who plays for the Edmonton Eskimos of the Canadian Football League, born in Jasper
 Zack Bronson, former professional football safety in the NFL for the San Francisco 49ers, born in Jasper
 Red Bryant, American football defensive end for the Arizona Cardinals of the National Football League (NFL), raised in Jasper
 James Byrd, Jr. (1949–1998), dragged to death behind a pick-up truck in 1998
 Phil Hennigan, former MLB pitcher for the Cleveland Indians and New York Mets, born in Jasper
 Robert Hunt, professional football player for the Miami Dolphins
 Roger Mobley, a pastor in Jasper and a child actor in the 1950s and 1960s
 SirVincent Rogers, former professional football player
 Michael Sarver, singer/songwriter, American Idol contestant
 Eugene Seale, former professional football player
 Sean Weatherspoon, former professional football player, raised in Jasper

References

External links
 

 City of Jasper official website
 Jasper/Lake Sam Rayburn Area Chamber of Commerce
 "Two Towns of Jasper", Point of View. PBS. January 22, 2003.

Cities in Texas
Cities in Jasper County, Texas
County seats in Texas